The Funding Act of 1870 (41st Congress, Sess. 2, ch. 256, enacted July 14, 1870) was an Act of Congress to re-fund the national debt.  It allowed the exchange of high interest, short-term floating bonds bearing lower interest and terms of up to 30 years. Principal and interest of the new issues would be paid in "coin of the present standard value."

Legislative history 
The bill was sponsored by Senator John Sherman (R) of Ohio.  Debate over the funding bill was long and intense.  The discussion focused very heavily on public virtue, national honesty, and avoiding "repudiation" on the one hand and unearned reward to speculators on the other.  Members generally agreed that an investor should finally receive no more and no less than he lent on a contract at the beginning.

1870 in American law
United States federal legislation